is a Japanese manga series written and illustrated by Shoko Hidaka. It was serialized in the monthly manga magazine Rutile from August 2006 to January 2015. It was adapted into a live-action film that was released on February 24, 2018.

Characters

 (audio drama); played by: Tsurugi Watanabe (film)
Youichi is a 19-year-old college student.

 (audio drama); played by: Kousei Amano (film)
Sakurai is a 38-year-old salaryman who Youichi is attracted to.

 (audio drama); played by: Atomu Mizuishi (film)
Takeo is Youichi's cousin and lives with him.

 (audio drama); played by: Yuito Obara (film)
Shouta is Youichi's cousin and lives with him.

 (audio drama); played by: Akihisa Shiono (film)
Kouki is Youichi's friend from college who is also interested in him.

 (audio drama); played by: Yasukaze Motomiya (film)
Kippei is the landlord of Youichi's home.

Media

Manga

Does the Flower Blossom? is written and illustrated by Shoko Hidaka. It is serialized in the manga magazine Rutile from the August 2006 issue to the January 2015 issue. The chapters were later released in five bound volumes by Gentosha under the Birz Comics Rutile Collection imprint.

In 2012, Digital Manga Publishing announced at Yaoi-Con that they had licensed the first three volumes in English for North American distribution. The series was published under their Juné imprint. Volume 1 was originally scheduled to be released in July 2013, but it was delayed until December 2013, until finally releasing in 2014.

Film
A live-action film adaptation produced by Toei Studios was announced in September 2017, starring Tsurugi Watanabe in his debut film role as Youichi Minagawa. Kousei Amano was later cast as Kazuaki Sakurai. Additional cast members include Akihisa Shiono, Yuito Obara, Atomu Mizuishi, and Yasukaze Motomiya. The film is directed by Kaori Tanimoto, with the script written by Natsuko Takahashi. It was released in theaters in Japan on February 24, 2018. The film's theme song is "Futari Negai Boshi" by Mika Tsunaki, which was released as a single on February 14, 2018. Postcards exclusively illustrated by Shoko Hidaka were distributed during the theatrical run, with the first week distributing a postcard of Youichi and the second week distributing a postcard of Sakurai.

Reception

In 2018, Does the Flower Blossom? was selected by visitors of the website Nijimen as one of the best boys' love manga for newcomers to the genre.

References

External links 
 
 
 

Digital Manga Publishing titles
Japanese drama films
2018 films
2018 LGBT-related films
2010s Japanese-language films
LGBT-related drama films
Live-action films based on manga
Manga adapted into films
Yaoi anime and manga